White bear may refer to:

Animals
 Polar bear, also known as a white bear
 Kermode bear, or spirit bear, a subspecies of American black bear in British Columbia, Canada

Buildings
 The White Bear, Clerkenwell, a public house in London
 White Bear railway station, a former train station in Adlington, Lancashire, England

People 

 Satanta (Kiowa leader) (ca. 1820–1878), or White Bear, great chief of the Kiowa tribe
 White Bear (Wabimakwa) (died 1870), Chief of Temagami First Nation, Ontario

Places

Canada
 White Bear, Saskatchewan, a hamlet in Saskatchewan, Canada
 White Bear 70, an Indian Reserve in Saskatchewan

United States
 White Bear Township, Minnesota, in Ramsey County
 White Bear, Missouri, an unincorporated community

Other uses
 White Bear (album), by the Temperance Movement, or the title song, 2016
 "White Bear" (Black Mirror), a 2013 television episode

See also
White Bear Lake (disambiguation)